Georgi Vladimirovich Burnash (born 8 August 1993) is a Russian professional football player.

Club career
He played for FC Lokomotiv Moscow in the 2012–13 Russian Cup game against FC Torpedo Armavir on 26 September 2012.

He made his Russian Football National League debut for FC Fakel Voronezh on 23 August 2015 in a game against FC Luch-Energiya Vladivostok.

References

External links
 
 Player page by sportbox.ru

1993 births
Footballers from Moscow
Living people
Russian footballers
Russia youth international footballers
Russia under-21 international footballers
Association football defenders
FC Lokomotiv Moscow players
FC Khimki players
FC Fakel Voronezh players
FC Avangard Kursk players
FC Tyumen players